Tamuz may refer to:

 Tammuz (Hebrew month), in the Jewish calendar
 Tammuz (Babylonian calendar), in the Arabic and Assyrian calendars
 Tammuz (mythology), a supernatural creature from Assyrian-Babylonian Mesopotamian religion
 Tamouz (band), an Israeli rock band
 Tamuz (kibbutz), an Israeli kibbutz
 Spike (missile) M113 Tamuz, an Israeli item of military equipment
 Tamuz Prize, an Israeli award for Singer of the Year
 Al Tammuz, Iraqi long range scud missile